Bassella is a municipality in the comarca of the Alt Urgell, in Catalonia, Spain. The village of Bassella, one of nine settlement which make up the municipality, is located at the confluence of the Segre river with the Salada river and at the point where the route from Solsona and the potash mines of Cardona (currently the L-301 road) meets the route between Lleida and La Seu d'Urgell (currently the C-1313 road). The ajuntament (town hall) is located in Castellnou de Bassella.

The municipality extends to both sides of the Segre river at the southern extremity of the Alt Urgell. Much of the territory has been flooded by the construction of the Rialb reservoir. It includes the southern exclave of Sant Mer within Pinell de Solsonès.

Subdivisions 
Populations are as of 2005
Aguilar (21), with the foundations of the castle of Aguilar de Bassella
Altès (41), with the church of Sant Pere (nineteenth century)
Bassella (20), with the parish church of la Mare de Déu de l'Assumpció, also known as the Church of la Mare de Déu de la Garrola, and a wooden suspension bridge
Castellnou de Bassella (7)
La Clua (20), on a hill, with a Romanesque church dating from the twelfth century
Guardiola (9), on the foothills of the Pubill range
Mirambell (23)
Ogern (123), on the road towards Solsona
Serinyana (1)

Demography 
The quoted populations are for the entire municipality.

References

 Panareda Clopés, Josep Maria; Rios Calvet, Jaume; Rabella Vives, Josep Maria (1989). Guia de Catalunya, Barcelona: Caixa de Catalunya.  (Spanish).  (Catalan).

External links 
Official site
 Government data pages 
Information from the Diputació de Lleida
Information from the Consell Comarcal de l'Alt Urgell

Municipalities in Alt Urgell
Populated places in Alt Urgell